Jason Calliste (born January 27, 1990) is a Canadian professional basketball player for the Moncton Magic of the National Basketball League of Canada (NBLC).

Early life 
Calliste is from Toronto and his father Jude runs an appliance-repair business in Ontario. Calliste moved to North Carolina to attend prep school.

College career
Calliste played basketball at Detroit for four years and earned a communications degree. In his last season with the Titans, Calliste averaged 14.4 points, 3.3 assists, and 3.1 rebounds per game. He took advantage of the graduate transfer rule and moved to Oregon for his final season of eligibility. He came off the bench to help the Ducks to an NCAA tournament appearance. Calliste averaged 12.4 points and 2.0 rebounds per game in his only season in Eugene. His best game was a 31-point performance on December 22, 2013 in a 100-96 overtime win over BYU.

Professional career
Calliste played his first professional season with the Maine Red Claws of the NBA Development League. In the 2015–16 season he played for BK Barons of Riga. In 2016, he rejoined the Red Claws. Later in the season, he returned to Canada to play for the KW Titans. In September he joined the Spanish team Palencia Baloncesto. In January 2018, Calliste joined the Moncton Magic and averaged 9.3 points and 2.7 rebounds per game in 34 games. In the 2018-19 season, Calliste averaged 9.4 points, 3.0 rebounds, and 1.3 assists per game. He was named to the All-Canadian Third Team. During the 2019-20 season, Calliste averaged 11.9 points, 3.5 rebounds, and 2.0 assists per game, earning All-Canadian First Team honors.

References

External links
Oregon Ducks bio

1990 births
Living people
Basketball players from Toronto
BK Barons players
Canadian expatriate basketball people in Spain
Canadian expatriate basketball people in the United States
Canadian expatriate sportspeople in Latvia
Canadian men's basketball players
Detroit Mercy Titans men's basketball players
KW Titans players
Maine Red Claws players
Moncton Magic players
Oregon Ducks men's basketball players
Palencia Baloncesto players
Point guards
Sportspeople from Scarborough, Toronto